Mid-American Conference Championship or Mid-American Conference Tournament may refer to:

 MAC Championship Game, the college football championship
 Mid-American Conference men's basketball tournament, the men's basketball championship tournament
 Mid-American Conference women's basketball tournament, the women's basketball championship tournament